Camilla Mancini (born 10 June 1994) is an Italian fencer who won one gold medal and one bronze at the 2019 Summer Universiade.

Biography

She won the cadet girls' foil at the 2010 Youth Olympic Games.
With the Italian team, she won a gold medal in team women's foil at the 2017 World Fencing Championships and silver at the 2018 World Fencing Championships.

See also
 Italy at the 2019 Summer Universiade

References

External links
 Camilla Mancini at FIE

1994 births
Living people
Italian female fencers
Universiade medalists in fencing
Universiade gold medalists for Italy
Universiade bronze medalists for Italy
Fencers at the 2010 Summer Youth Olympics
Youth Olympic gold medalists for Italy
Medalists at the 2015 Summer Universiade
Medalists at the 2019 Summer Universiade
21st-century Italian women